Squires Gate railway station serves the Squires Gate area of the popular seaside resort of Blackpool, Lancashire, England, although it is located just outside the borough boundary. It lies on the Blackpool South to Preston line and is the nearest station to Blackpool Airport.

History
Between 1865 and 1872, Stony Hill railway station was located in the same area. The present station opened on 14 September 1931 by the LMS. The station was host to 12 (LMS) caravans in 1937 and 1938 followed by 17 caravans in 1939. 15 camping coaches were also positioned here by the London Midland Region from 1954 to 1967, 14 in 1968 and 1969, 11 in 1970 and 12 in 1971.

It was planned that Squires Gate may have been renamed Blackpool International Station at some point, along with the provision of direct and flat surface access from the station to the airport.

Facilities
The station is unstaffed, but has been provided with a ticket machine, digital PIS screen and a long-line P.A system to offer train running information.  CCTV, timetable posters and a pay phone are also available.

Services

The majority of services on the line are operated by Class 150.

References

Further reading

External links

Railway stations in the Borough of Fylde
DfT Category F2 stations
Former London, Midland and Scottish Railway stations
Railway stations in Great Britain opened in 1931
Northern franchise railway stations
Airport railway stations in the United Kingdom